Young Sound is a marine channel with a fjord structure in King Christian X Land, East Greenland. Administratively it is part of the Northeast Greenland National Park zone.

History
The fjord was given the name "Young’s Bay" by William Scoresby in 1822. He named it in honour of British scientist Thomas Young (1773– 1829), secretary of the Board of Longitude. During the 1869–70 Second German North Polar Expedition this body of water was surveyed by Carl Koldewey, who used the name "Tyrolerfjord" for the whole water body. Later, during the 1929–1930 Expedition to East Greenland, Lauge Koch reinstated the name "Young Sund" for the outer section of the water body.

Just north of Daneborg there was a Danish hunting station named Sandodden which is now abandoned.

Geography
Young Sound opens in the northern side of the mouth area of Gael Hamke Bay, north of Cape Breusing. It extends north and northeast of Clavering Island and southwest of Wollaston Foreland; to the north lies A. P. Olsen Land.

Zackenberg Station and Daneborg Station are located on the Wollaston Foreland shore of the sound, the latter close to its mouth.  Basalt Island, also known as "Klippe", is a small island in the middle of Young Sound, about  NW of its entrance.Sandøen, a small sandy islet with a walrus colony, is located in the mouth area.

See also
List of fjords of Greenland

References

External links
 Young Sund Campaign 2016 - Isaaffik
 Wehrmacht occupations in the new world: Archaeological and historical investigations in Northeast Greenland

Fjords of Greenland